The 2013 Idol Star Athletics Championships (Hangul: 아이돌 스타 올림픽), also known as the 2013 Idol Athletics - Chuseok Special, was held at Goyang Gymnasium in Goyang, South Korea on September 3, 2013 and was broadcast on MBC from September 19 to 20, 2013. At the championships a total number of 10 events (7 in athletics, 2 in archery and 1 in futsal) were contested: 5 by men and 5 by women. There were a total number of 160 participating K-pop singers and celebrities, divided into 5 teams.

Results

Men 

Athletics

Archery

Futsal

Women 

Athletics

Archery

Ratings

References

MBC TV original programming
South Korean variety television shows
South Korean game shows
2013 in South Korean television
Idol Star Athletics Championships